Robert Gene Rice (born July 11, 1944, in Boscobel, Wisconsin, United States) is an American country music singer-songwriter, known professionally as Bobby G. Rice. Between 1970 and 1988, Rice released nine albums and charted thirty songs on the Billboard Hot Country Singles chart. His biggest hit, "You Lay So Easy On My Mind," peaked at Number 3 in 1973.

Discography

Albums

Singles

References

External links

[ Bobby G. Rice] at Allmusic

1944 births
American country singer-songwriters
American male singer-songwriters
Living people
People from Boscobel, Wisconsin
Singer-songwriters from Wisconsin